Cone Island is a small island in the Alexander Archipelago of Alaska, situated south of Revillagigedo Island near Ketchikan.

Islands of Alaska
Islands of the Alexander Archipelago